Herálec is a municipality and village in Žďár nad Sázavou District in the Vysočina Region of the Czech Republic. It has about 1,300 inhabitants.

Administrative parts
Villages of Brušovec, Český Herálec, Kocanda and Kuchyně are administrative parts of Herálec.

Notable people
František Sláma (1923–2004), cellist

References

Villages in Žďár nad Sázavou District